Richard Scrope may refer to:
Richard Scrope, 1st Baron Scrope of Bolton (c. 1327–1403), English soldier and courtier, builder of Bolton Castle
Richard Scrope (bishop) (c. 1350–1405), Archbishop of York
Richard Scrope, 3rd Baron Scrope of Bolton (1394–1420)

See also
 Richard Scroope (died 1468), Bishop of Carlisle